"Trust" is a 1990 single by British boy band / pop group Brother Beyond, taken from their second album, also entitled Trust, released in 1989. It made the Top 60 on the UK Singles Chart, peaking at Number 53, in March 1990. After six consecutive hits to peak inside the Top 50, this song failed to extend that record, but it was, anyway, their ninth consecutive Top 60 hit (having their first single, "I Should Have Lied" failed to chart in the UK Top 75, back in 1986, while their second single, "How Many Times", had only reached Number 62, in 1987). The follow-up to the Trust single, the tune called "The Girl I Used to Know", charting at Number 48, would be their tenth consecutive Top 60, and seventh Top 50 hit in general. Released in January 1991, this latter song would be their final single, since the group disbanded soon after, though attaining some success with that track in the United States.

The song was written by band members David Ben White and Carl Fysh.

Related pages
Nathan Moore
Drive On

References
Paul Gambaccini, Tim Rice, Jonathan Rice (1993), British Hit Singles, Guinness Publishing ltd,

External links
Nathan Moore Official Website

1990 singles
Brother Beyond songs
British songs
1989 songs